Love Likes Coincidences is a 2011 Turkish drama film, directed by Ömer Faruk Sorak, starring Mehmet Günsür and Belçim Bilgin Erdoğan as star crossed lovers whose lives are intertwined by a series of coincidences.

Production
The film was shot on location in Istanbul and Ankara, Turkey.

Plot
One September morning in 1977 in Ankara, a young man rushes his pregnant wife to the hospital for the impending birth. He crashes into another car, whose driver is another father-to-be. As a result of the accident, the woman in the car they hit gives birth prematurely, resulting in both babies being born on the same day at the same hospital. That accident becomes the first of many coincidences that will connect the fates of Özgür and Deniz, whose lives will continue to intersect throughout the rest of their childhood and teenage years in Ankara. Each time their paths intersect, the cause of the intersection greatly transforms both Özgür and Deniz’s lives. However, their lives never fully intertwine because whatever it is that brings them together manages to build a wall between until their next encounter, some 25 years on, in Istanbul.

Cast
Mehmet Günsur - Özgür
Belçim Bilgin Erdoğan - Deniz
Altan Erkekli - Yılmaz 
Şebnem Sönmez - Neriman
Hüseyin Avni Danyal - Ömer
Ayda Aksel- İnci
Doruk Kara - Ahmet
Berna Konur- Zeynep 
Ümit Bülent Dinçer

Release

Remake
An Indian Telugu-language remake Iddari Lokam Okate was released in 2019.

See also
 Turkish films of 2011
 2011 in film

References

External links
  
 

2011 films
2010s Turkish-language films
2011 romantic drama films
Films set in Turkey
Films set in Istanbul
Films set in Ankara
Turkish romantic drama films
Films scored by Ozan Çolakoğlu
Films shot in Ankara
Films shot in Istanbul